The Sigma DP2 Quattro is a large sensor digital compact camera announced by Sigma Corporation on February 13, 2014. It is the first Sigma camera to feature a new, "Quattro" branded sensor.

Software

Sigma Photo Pro 

Post-processing of RAW X3F and JPEG from all digital SIGMA-branded cameras

Version 6.x  is free Download for Windows 7+ and Mac OS Version 10.7 (6.3.x). The actual latest version is 6.5.4 (MacOSX 10.9+, Win 7+).

References

http://www.dpreview.com/products/sigma/compacts/sigma_dp2q/specifications

DP2 Quattro